Ptarmigan Pass, elevation , is a mountain pass that crosses the Continental Divide in Rocky Mountain National Park in Colorado in the United States.

See also

Southern Rocky Mountains
Southern Rocky Mountain Front
Colorado mountain passes

References

External links

Landforms of Grand County, Colorado
Landforms of Larimer County, Colorado
Rocky Mountain National Park
Mountain passes of Colorado
Great Divide of North America